Anis Boussaïdi (born 10 April 1981) is a Tunisian football coach and a former player. He is an assistant manager for Espérance.

Club career 
As of January 2008, he was playing for K.V. Mechelen on loan from FC Arsenal Kyiv. Mechelen had an option to buy Boussaidi at the end of the 2007/08 season, who was loaned out immediately from Kyiv to the Belgian side following a transfer from FC Metalurh Donetsk in December 2007. Austria's Red Bull Salzburg signed him for the season 2008/09 and offered him a contract over three years. After his contract ran out at Red Bull Salzburg, he joined Greek club PAOK on a one-year deal. He played 13 times and scored once in his time in Greece. In 2011, he joined Russian club FC Rostov.

Boussaïdi signed for SC Tavriya Simferopol in the Winter of 2011, playing for them until the club disbanded following the annexation of Crimea by the Russian Federation.

International career 
He was a member of the Tunisian 2004 Olympic football team, who exited in the first round, finishing third in group C, behind group and gold medal winners Argentina and runners-up Australia.

In 2020 he took his first manager job, that of Stade Tunisien.

References

External links
 

1981 births
Living people
Tunisian footballers
Association football fullbacks

Stade Tunisien players
FC Metalurh Donetsk players
K.V. Mechelen players
FC Red Bull Salzburg players
PAOK FC players
FC Rostov players
SC Tavriya Simferopol players

Tunisian expatriate footballers
Expatriate footballers in Ukraine
Tunisian expatriate sportspeople in Ukraine
Expatriate footballers in Belgium
Tunisian expatriate sportspeople in Belgium
Expatriate footballers in Austria
Tunisian expatriate sportspeople in Austria
Expatriate footballers in Greece
Tunisian expatriate sportspeople in Greece
Expatriate footballers in Russia
Tunisian expatriate sportspeople in Russia

Tunisian Ligue Professionnelle 1 players
Ukrainian Premier League players
Belgian Pro League players
Super League Greece players
Russian Premier League players

Mediterranean Games gold medalists for Tunisia
Mediterranean Games medalists in football
Competitors at the 2001 Mediterranean Games
Tunisia international footballers
Footballers at the 2004 Summer Olympics
Olympic footballers of Tunisia
2012 Africa Cup of Nations players
2013 Africa Cup of Nations players

Tunisian football managers
Stade Tunisien managers
Tunisian Ligue Professionnelle 1 managers
21st-century Tunisian people